Edward James Collins Wynter (1904–1974) was an Australian professional rugby league  footballer for the University club in the New South Wales Rugby League premiership competition.

Ed Wynter died at Lane Cove, New South Wales on 16 August 1974, age 70.

Career playing statistics

Point scoring summary

Matches played

References

Australian rugby league players
Sydney University rugby league team players
1904 births
1974 deaths
Place of birth missing